Somatidia maculata is a species of beetle in the family Cerambycidae. It was described by Broun in 1921.

References

maculata
Beetles described in 1921